

2019 Statistics

2018  Statistics

Notes
1.The results had been converted from a report generated in Persian Solar Hijri calendar
2.The reports of the airports in Iranian islands had not been published since 2017; All the existing reports are estimates.

2017  Statistics

2016  Statistics

2015  Statistics

2014  Statistics

2013  Statistics

2012  Statistics

2011  Statistics

See also
List of airports in Iran
List of airlines of Iran
Iran Civil Aviation Organization
Transport in Iran
Iran

References 

(PDF) ماهنامه آمار عملکرد شرکت فرودگاههای کشور – شماره بیست و هشتم (in Persian). Iranian Airports Holding Company. September 2015
(PDF) پروازی \ آمار میلادی (in Persian). Iranian Airports Holding Company. February 2016

External links 
 Ministry of Road and Urban Development Of Iran Official Website
 Civil Aviation Organization of Iran
 Iran Airports Company

Iran

Airports, busiest